"For Loving You" is a 1967 duet by Bill Anderson and Jan Howard.  The single was the duo's most successful release. "For Loving You" went to number one on the country charts in four weeks and spent 20 weeks on the chart.

Chart performance

Bill Anderson and Jan Howard

Cover Versions
A year later, Skeeter Davis and Don Bowman charted a cover version which went to number 72 on the same chart.

Skeeter Davis and Don Bowman

References

1967 singles
Male–female vocal duets
Bill Anderson (singer) songs
Jan Howard songs
Skeeter Davis songs
Song recordings produced by Owen Bradley
1967 songs
Decca Records singles